Ariege Bay is a former hamlet in the "St. Barbe District" of the province of Newfoundland and Labrador. It is located near Main Brook.

See also
 List of ghost towns in Newfoundland and Labrador

References

Ghost towns in Newfoundland and Labrador